This is a list of rural localities in Kaliningrad Oblast. Kaliningrad Oblast (Kaliningradskaya oblast), often referred to as the Kaliningrad Region in English, or simply Kaliningrad, is a federal subject of the Russian Federation that is located on the coast of the Baltic Sea. As an oblast, its constitutional status is equal to each of the other 85 federal subjects. Its administrative center is the city of Kaliningrad, formerly known as Königsberg. It is the only Baltic port in the Russian Federation that remains ice-free in winter. According to the 2010 census, it had a population of 941,873. The oblast is a semi-exclave, bordered by Poland to the south and Lithuania to the east and north, so residents may only travel visa-free to the rest of Russia via sea or air.

Bagrationovsky District 
Rural localities in Bagrationovsky District:

 Chekhovo
 Gvardeyskoye
 Slavskoye

Baltiysky District, Kaliningrad Oblast 
Rural localities in Baltiysky District:

 Divnoye

Guryevsky 
Rural localities in Guryevsky urban okrug:

 Ushakovo

Guryevsky District 
Rural localities in Guryevsky District:

 Avangardnoye
 Mendeleyevo

Gusevsky District 
Rural localities in Gusevsky District:

 Mayakovskoye

Gvardeysky District 
Rural localities in Gvardeysky District:

 Bolshaya Polyana
 Talpaki
 Znamensk

Krasnoznamensky District 
Rural localities in Krasnoznamensky District:

 Kutuzovo
 Sadovo

Nesterovsky District 
Rural localities in Nesterovsky District:

 Chernyshevskoye
 Chistye Prudy
 Krasnolesye
 Yasnaya Polyana

Ozyorsky District 
Rural localities in Ozyorsky District:

 Donskoye
 Krasnoyarskoye

Polessky District 
Rural localities in Polessky District:

 Saranskoe

Pravdinsky District 
Rural localities in Pravdinsky District:

 Domnovo
 Druzhba
Gusevo

Slavsky District 
Rural localities in Slavsky District:

 Bolshakovo

Svetly 
Rural localities in Svetly urban okrug:

 Lyublino

Zelenogradsky District 
Rural localities in Zelenogradsky District:

 Kumachyovo
 Lesnoy
 Mokhovoye
 Rybachy

See also
 
 Lists of rural localities in Russia

References

Kaliningrad Oblast